Aleshin, Alyoshin is a Russian surname. Notable people with the surname include:

Evgeny Aleshin (born 1979), Russian retired swimmer
Mikhail Aleshin (born 1987), Russian professional racing driver
Maxim Aleshin, Russian acrobat and former gymnast 
Kirill Aleshin (born 1997), Russian ice dancer 
Yegor Alyoshin (born 1992), Russian professional ice hockey player